The Bremerhaven Lighthouse, also known as the Simon Loschen Tower or Loschen Lighthouse, is the rear light of a pair of leading lights at the New Harbour of Bremerhaven, Germany. It is the oldest operative lighthouse on the mainland along Germany's North Sea shore and is counted among the city's landmarks.

History 
From 1853 to 1855 the lighthouse was built in the style of northern German Brick Gothic at the northern side of the harbour's lock from 1852, using plans by architect Simon Loschen from Bremen. It went operational in 1856. Next to the lighthouse there is another brick house that used to serve as quarters and service building for the lighthouse and lock keepers and was partially destroyed during World War II.

The fire was first lit by a gas flame and was later electrified in 1925. It was automated in 1951.

Today's function 
The original range of leading lights pointing down the river Weser was replaced by another lighting in 1959. For the upstream range that is still in use today, the tower still serves as the rear light. The corresponding front light Unterfeuer Bremerhaven is situated in a small red and white lighthouse on the southern pier of the lock, also called "the minaret" by locals.

Gallery

See also 

 List of lighthouses and lightvessels in Germany

References

External links 
 
 

Lighthouses completed in 1855
Lighthouses in Germany
Brick Gothic
Buildings and structures in Bremerhaven
Tourist attractions in Bremen (state)
Lighthouses of the North Sea